The Aura Will Prevail is the sixth studio album by American keyboardist George Duke. It was released in 1975 through MPS Records. Recording sessions took place at Paramount Recording Studios in Hollywood, California. The album features contributions from Alphonso Johnson, Leon "Ndugu" Chancler and Airto Moreira.

Duke played various keyboard instruments on the album, including Rhodes electric piano, Wurlitzer electric piano, Hohner clavinet, ARP Odyssey, ARP String Ensemble, Mutron Phaser, Mutron Dual Phaser, Minimoog, Moog bass and various pedalboards.

Reaching a peak position of number 111 on the US Billboard 200, the album remained on the chart for a total of ten weeks.

Track listing

Personnel 
 George Duke – vocals, moog bass (tracks: 3, 7), Rhodes electric piano, Wurlitzer electric piano, clavinet, synthesizer (ARP Odyssey, minimoog, ARP String Ensemble), pedalboard
 Alphonso Johnson – electric bass (tracks: 1-2, 4-6, 8-9)
 Leon "Ndugu" Chancler – voice (track 2), vocals (track 5), drums, congas
 Airto Moreira – percussion (tracks: 1, 5)
 Gee Janzen – vocals (track 5)
 Kathy Woehrle – vocals (track 5)
 Sylvia St. James – vocals (track 5)
Technical
 Baldhard G. Falk – producer, photography
 Kerry McNabb – mixing & recording
 Wilfried "Sätty" Podriech – design

Chart history

References

External links 
 
 George Duke's 1970s discography on his website

1975 albums
George Duke albums
MPS Records albums